This was a new event on the ITF Women's Circuit. Kurumi Nara won the tournament, defeating Alison Riske in the final, 3–6, 6–3, 6–3.

Seeds

Main draw

Finals

Top half

Bottom half

References 
 Main draw

Oregon Challenger - Singles